Walter F Phillips is an England international lawn bowler.

Bowls career
He won a gold medal in the fours at the 1958 British Empire and Commonwealth Games in Cardiff with Norman King, John Scadgell and John Bettles.

He was twice a runner-up in the National Championship.

References

English male bowls players
Commonwealth Games medallists in lawn bowls
Commonwealth Games gold medallists for England
Bowls players at the 1958 British Empire and Commonwealth Games
Medallists at the 1958 British Empire and Commonwealth Games